San Michele a Castiglione is a 12th-century, Roman Catholic church located in the town of Castiglione di Garfagnana, in the province of Lucca, region of Tuscany, Italy.

History
The Romanesque style church was mentioned for the first time in a Papal bull of 1168, and the façade has elegant designs using dark and white stone. A portico with columns with Corinthian capitals as added in the 18th-century. The church houses a Madonna (1389) by Giuliano di Simone (1389) and a 15th-century wooden crucifix.

References

Romanesque architecture in Tuscany
13th-century Roman Catholic church buildings in Italy
Churches in the province of Lucca